Birchmount is a surface light rail transit (LRT) stop under construction on Line 5 Eglinton, a new line that is part of the Toronto subway system. It will be located in the Ionview neighbourhood at the intersection of Eglinton Avenue and Birchmount Road. It is scheduled to open in 2023.

The stop is located in the middle of Eglinton Avenue on the east side of its intersection with Birchmount Road. The stop has side platforms which will be accessed from the pedestrian crossing on the east side of the signalized street intersection. On the east side of this stop, there are two separate crossovers, one trailing point and the other facing point.

Surface connections 

, the following are the proposed connecting routes that would serve this station when Line 5 Eglinton opens:

References

External links

Line 5 Eglinton stations